The Austria women's national rugby union team are a national sporting side of Austria, representing them at rugby union. The side first played in 2004.

History
Austria has been participating in the FIRA-AER European Championships since 2005. First Captain of the Austrian Women's National Team was Renee Carmine-Jones (originally from Canada, in Austria since 1984) who officially initiated Women's Rugby for the Union and set up the women's national team (Season 2003/2004), built up women's rugby at Celtic Rugby Football Club and, at the request of the Union President following their first Test against the Czech Republic, set up the second women's team at Rugby Club Donau and has been developing the women's game in Austria, now with 5 National (Frauen Bundesliga) League team, and in her region ever since through her Regional League and Emerging Nations Training Camps for the bottom 15-20 Nations of Europe.

Results summary
(Full internationals only)

Austrian National Women's League Teams

FRU Schoenbrunn (Frauen Rugby Union - Vienna Union of Celtic and Donau Women's Teams)
WRCI (Women's Rugby Club Innsbruck)
RC Graz (Women's Rugby Team Graz)
RC Krems (Women's Rugby Team Krems)
RC Spartans Melk (Women's Rugby Team Melk)

List of Coaches
Coach:    Christopher Jones  (March–June 2004)
Co-Coach: Renee Carmine-Jones (Sept.2003-June 2004)
Coach:    Thomas Brinninger (Sept.2004-April 2005)
Co-Coach: Renee Carmine-Jones (Sept.2004-April 2005)
Coach:    Renee Carmine-Jones (April 2005-present)
Co-Coach: Philipp Grausam (April 2005-June 2006)
Co-Coach: Gordon Chiu (March 2010-June 2010)

List of Captains
Renee Carmine-Jones (2003-2005 (2006 pregnant) + 2007)
Catherine Teisset (2006)
Eva Weissenböck (2008-2012)

Results

Full internationals

Other matches

See also
 Rugby union in Austria

External links
 Österreichischer Rugby Verband - Official Site 
 Women's Rugby Austria - Official Women's site

Women's national rugby union teams
Rugby union in Austria
Rugby union
European national women's rugby union teams